Jennifer Blakeman is a musician and music industry executive. Blakeman was a keyboardist for multiple bands predominantly in the 1980s and '90s, before starting a career in the music publishing industry.

Musical career
Blakeman started her professional musical career playing in bands around Shreveport, Louisiana while in college, with an eye to pursue a career as a session musician and entertainment attorney.  After coming to the attention of Eddie Van Halen who enlisted her to help create a unique signature keyboard sound for him, she spent several years working closely with him programming his keyboards, most notably for the Van Halen OU812 album.   As an early member of the band Private Life, a hard rock formation produced by both Ted Templeman and Eddie Van Halen, she co-wrote, recorded and released two albums with this band, Shadows (1988) and Private Life (1990) through Warner Bros. Records. Later Blakeman worked as a touring keyboardist and backing vocalist for British rock artist Billy Idol, the Australian pop rock band Savage Garden (most notably on the Affirmation album), British pop artist Billie Myers, American singer David Cassidy, and many other artists.  Her compositions and recordings can be heard in films including Wayne's World, Gremlins and Superstars and Cannonballs.

Business career
Blakeman became an executive at Cherry Entertainment Group, Atlantic Records, 
Universal Pictures, Universal Music Group, and later Zomba Publishing. After the purchase of Zomba by Universal Music Publishing, Blakeman continued working with the company as the Senior Vice President of Creative Affairs. In this function she was responsible for the publishing of artists including Justin Timberlake, Ne-Yo, Skylar Grey, T-Pain, Anthony Hamilton and Linkin Park. She co-founded Atlas Music Publishing Group where she served as Chief Creative Officer, overseeing a roster of writers whose songs have been recorded by John Legend, Kelly Clarkson, Beyonce, Miley, Sam Hunt, Jay-Z, Kendrick Lamar, SZA, Dr. Dre and hundreds of others. In 2018 she formed one77 Music, a boutique creative-focused music publishing company based in New York City where her clients include Sean "The Pen" Garrett; producers, Mike & Keys; artists Alex Winston and Secret Weapon; the catalog of Al Jackson Jr and joint ventures with Chris Farren's Nashville-based independent publishing company Combustion Music and Atlanta-based Chris Jones of Stateline Entertainment, among others.  

She is an adjunct professor of music publishing at New York University.  After serving as president of The Recording Academy's New York chapter board from 2010-12, she was elected to serve four years as trustee on the national board of The Recording Academy, followed by two more years as president of the New York chapter board.  She was most recently re-elected to serve as trustee on the national board.

See also 
 National Academy of Recording Arts and Sciences
 Zomba Group of Companies
 Universal Music Publishing Group

References

External links 

A&R people
Living people
American music industry executives
American music managers
Year of birth missing (living people)